Western Electricity Supply Company of Odisha or WESCO() was incorporated as a Public Limited Company of Government of Odisha on 19 November 1997 to carry out the distribution and retail supply business of electricity in Western Odisha. Western Electricity Supply Company of Odisha got its Certificate of Commencement of Business on 30 December 1997 and started functioning as a subsidiary of Grid Corporation of Odisha, a Government of Odisha Power Utility, from 26 November 1998 under Distribution and Retail Supply License.  Subsequently, the company obtained its own license for retail supply from Odisha Electricity Regulatory Commission with effect from April 1999. After privatisation of distribution business under power sector reform process, WESCO became a subsidiary of TATA Power Ltd, with acquisition 51% majority share-holding. The authorised and paid up capital of the company is 48.65 crores  The licensed area of operation of the company is 48,000 sq. km and covers nine revenue districts of Western Odisha namely, Sundargarh, Jharsuguda, Sambalpur, Deogarh, Bargarh, Sonepur, Bolangir, Kalahandi and Nuapada. The corporate office is in Burla.

References

External links
 Official Website of Western Electricity Supply Company Of Odisha

Energy in Odisha
State agencies of Odisha
State electricity agencies of India
Indian companies established in 1997
Energy companies established in 1997
Electric-generation companies of India
1997 establishments in Orissa